Eugen Nikolaus Ahnström (28 September 1904 – 17 February 1974) was a Swedish diver. He competed in the 1928 Summer Olympics.

References

1904 births
1974 deaths
Divers at the 1928 Summer Olympics
Swedish male divers
Olympic divers of Sweden
Divers from Stockholm
20th-century Swedish people